Hypermethylated in cancer 1 protein is a protein that in humans is encoded by the HIC1 gene.

References

Further reading

External links 
 

Transcription factors